The 2001 WNBA season was the fourth season for the Washington Mystics. The Mystics finished with the worst record in the Eastern Conference.

Offseason

WNBA Draft

Regular season

Season standings

Season schedule

Player stats

References

Washington Mystics seasons
Washington
Washington Mystics